The Ho–Sainteny agreement, officially the Accord Between France and the Democratic Republic of Vietnam, known in Vietnamese as Hiệp định sơ bộ Pháp-Việt, was an agreement made on March 6, 1946, between Ho Chi Minh, President of the Democratic Republic of Vietnam, and Jean Sainteny, Special Envoy of France. It recognized Vietnam as a "Free State" within the French Union, and permitted France to continue stationing troops in North Vietnam.

References 

First Indochina War
1946 in Vietnam
Treaties concluded in 1946
Treaties of the Provisional Government of the French Republic
Treaties of North Vietnam
France–Vietnam relations